The  Rough Riders were the  1st US Volunteer Cavalry Regiment during the Spanish American War.

Rough riders, roughriders, rough rider or roughrider may also refer to:

Military and police
 City of London Yeomanry (Rough Riders), a defunct British Army regiment
 4th New Zealand Contingent  during the Second Boer War           
 Rough rider (rank), a now defunct rank and appointment in the British Army, still used in the Royal Canadian Mounted Police
 The Rough Riders, a corps of expert horsemen established by the Canadian North-West Mounted Police in 1873

Sports
 A participant in a rodeo, especially:
 any Australian rodeo
 the Angola Prison Rodeo in Louisiana
 a bullrider
 Saskatchewan Roughriders, a Canadian Football League team
 Ottawa Rough Riders, a former Canadian Football League team
 Frisco RoughRiders, a minor league baseball team in Texas
 Cedar Rapids RoughRiders, a junior ice hockey team in the United States Hockey League
 Long Island Rough Riders, an American soccer team in the USL Premier Development League
 Peoria Pirates, known as the Peoria Rough Riders while in the United Indoor Football league 
 Catasauqua High School Rough Riders, Catasauqua, Pennsylvania
 Roosevelt High School (Seattle, Washington) Roughriders
 Port Angeles High School (Port Angeles, Washington) Roughriders
 Center High School (Texas), Center, Texas, Roughriders
 West Virginia Roughriders, an American indoor football team in the American Arena League

Arts and entertainment
 Rough Riders (rollercoaster), a themed rollercoaster that operated in New York's Coney Island from 1907 to 1914
 The Rough Riders (film), a 1927 fictional film set during the Spanish–American War
 Rough Riders a 1940s Western film series starring Buck Jones
 "Rough Riders", a 1943 march by Karl King
 The Rough Riders (TV series), a 1950s U.S. series set in the American West
 Rough Riders (miniseries), a 1997 miniseries about the Spanish–American War
 Rough Rider (film), a 2014 documentary
 "Rough Rider", a song by Prince Buster
 Rough Riders comic book, published by Aftershock, written by Adam Glass, drawn by Patrick Olliffe, about a team of heroes led by Teddy Roosevelt.
 Rough Riders (album), third album by Lakeside

Other uses
 Rough Rider Award, presented to prominent North Dakotans by the governor of the state
 A series of toy cars made by Matchbox
 Tamiya Rough Rider, a 1979 1:10 radio-controlled off-road buggy by Tamiya

See also
 Ruff Rider, an album by Tanya Stephens
 "Ruff Ryders' Anthem", a song by DMX
 Ruff Ryders Entertainment, a hip hop record label
 Rough ride (disambiguation)